Arnar Jónsson (born 21 January 1943) is an Icelandic actor. He has played more leading roles in theaters than any other Icelandic actor. He starred in the film Outlaw and also in 17 other leading roles and about 200 other roles in theater.

Personal life
Arnar was born in Akureyri. He is married to Þórhildur Þorleifsdóttir.  He likes golf (he plays in competition) and also brought up 5 children. His daughter Sólveig Arnarsdóttir is also an actress.

Filmography

Notes and references

External links

Jonsson, Arnar
People from Akureyri
Icelandic male stage actors
Icelandic male voice actors
Jonsson, Arnar
Icelandic male film actors